Partizanskoye is a rural locality (a selo) in Navlinsky District, Bryansk Oblast, Russia. The population was 82 as of 2010.

Geography 
Partizanskoye is located 13 km southwest of Navlya (the district's administrative centre) by road. Ugorye is the nearest rural locality.

References 

Rural localities in Navlinsky District